Elisabet Hermodsson (20 September 1927 – 11 May 2017) was a Swedish writer, poet, composer and artist. She became well known in the 1970s for poetry inspired by second-wave feminism.

Hermodsson was born in Gothenburg.

References

Further reading 
 

1927 births
2017 deaths
Swedish composers
Swedish women poets
Swedish feminists
20th-century Swedish poets
People from Gothenburg
20th-century Swedish women writers
Swedish women composers